The Cessna 308 was a prototype military light transport aircraft based on the successful O-1 Bird Dog (Cessna 305) observation aircraft. Only one aircraft was completed, and the project did not proceed further due to a lack of orders.

Development
The Cessna 308 was conceived as an enlarged model 305 that would carry four people for the military light transport role and was developed in response to a US Army requirement.

The resulting design was first flown in July 1951. While the aircraft was based on the model 305, it incorporated a four-place cabin similar to the then current production Cessna 170. The prototype was powered by a Lycoming GSO-580 geared, supercharged, eight-cylinder engine, producing . The prototype featured a  wingspan, taildragger landing gear and a  gross take-off weight.

The US Army chose the de Havilland Canada DHC-2 Beaver for the intended light transport role putting it into service as the L-20A. As a result, development of the Cessna 308 was not continued beyond the completion of a single prototype.

Specifications (Cessna 308 prototype)

References

External links
 Cessna 308 photo

1950s United States military utility aircraft
308
Cancelled military aircraft projects of the United States
Single-engined tractor aircraft
High-wing aircraft
Aircraft first flown in 1951